Anthony Clow McAllister Johnston (6 June 1917 – 1993) was a Scottish amateur footballer who played as a centre half in the Scottish League for Queen's Park. He was capped by Scotland at amateur level.

References 

1917 births
1993 deaths
Scottish footballers
Queen's Park F.C. players
Scottish Football League players
Scotland amateur international footballers
Footballers from Glasgow
Partick Thistle F.C. players
St Bernard's F.C. wartime guest players
Stirling Albion F.C. wartime guest players
Association football central defenders

Raith Rovers F.C. players
Brora Rangers F.C. players